Pachylaelapidae is a family of mites in the order Mesostigmata. There are about 16 genera and more than 200 described species in Pachylaelapidae.

Genera
These 16 genera belong to the family Pachylaelapidae:

 Chaetodellus Mašán & Halliday, 2013
 Elaphrolaelaps Berlese, 1910
 Mirabulbus Liu & Ma, 2001
 Neopachylaelaps Mašán, 2007
 Olopachys Berlese, 1910
 Onchodellus Berlese, 1904
 Pachydellus Mašán, 2007
 Pachyglobolaelaps Mašán, 2014
 Pachylaelaps Berlese, 1888
 Pachylaelapsoides Mašán, 2007
 Pachyseiulus Moraza & Johnston, 1990
 Pachyseius Berlese, 1910
 Pachysphaerolaelaps Mašán, 2007
 Paralaelaps Trägårdh, 1908
 Pseudopachys Berlese, 1916
 Sphaerolaelaps Berlese, 1903

References

Mesostigmata
Acari families